Hoa Sen University is a private university in Ho Chi Minh City, Vietnam. The predecessor of this university was Hoa Sen College.

Hoa Sen is a leading university in Vietnam; it is known for quality in education, training, and internationally recognized research for the community. It was one of the first private universities founded in Vietnam after this was legalized by the government. Its mission is "To contribute to the rapid, sustainable, and humane  development of the Vietnamese and regional economy and society."

History
The predecessor of Hoa Sen College was the School of Foreign Languages and Information Technology, which was established under the Decision 257/QĐ-UB dated August 12, 1991 by the Chairman of Ho Chi Minh City People Committee (the mayor). The school has been supported by Lotus Association in France. On October 11, 1994, the school was turned into a semi-private school. In 2001, the school inaugurated its second campus in Quang Trung Software Park, Ho Chi Minh City. In 2005, the school was officially upgraded to become Hoa Sen University.

On November 30, 2006, the Vietnamese prime minister signed a decision to establish Hoa Sen University on the base of Hoa Sen College. One of the university's founding principles was a not-for-profit orientation that focused on reinvestment in education activities - one of the first and only educational institution to do so in Vietnam.

On January 12, 2016, Hoa Sen University became the first university at Vietnam were accredited by ACBSP.

Controversy 
In 2016, Hoa Sen University officially sought non-profit status, but was hindered by an ongoing conflict between the board of directors and shareholders who were against this not-for-profit orientation. A hostile takeover ensued, and although met with resistance from students who protested against the new for-profit direction, the board of directors was entirely replaced and administrative staff resistant to the takeover were purged. All Hoa Sen University communications have since been stripped of any mention of its "not-for-profit" mission, including the signature red banner in Hoa Sen University's logo.

Faculties
Faculty of Sciences and Technology
Faculty of Economics and Commerce
Faculty of Languages and Cultural Studies
Faculty of Polytechnics

International academic partners
NIIT, (NIIT Technologies), Mumbai, India
ITIN, (IT Institute), Cergy, France
UBI, Brussels, Belgium
ESCIA, Pontoise, France
University of the South, Toulon-Var, Toulon, France

References

External links
Hoa Sen University official site 

Universities in Ho Chi Minh City
1991 establishments in Vietnam
Educational institutions established in 1991